Kshanam is a 2021 Indian Malayalam-language horror-thriller film directed by Suresh Unnithan and produced by Deshaan Movie Factory, along with Roshan Pictures. 

The film stars Lal, Bharath, Ajmal Ameer, Baiju, Krrish, Devan, Sneha Ajith, Maala Parvathi and Lekha Prajapathi in lead roles. The screenplay for the film is written by Sreekumar Aroorkutti. The film's score is composed by Gopi Sundar. The film was released on 10 December 2021, and received mostly-negative reviews.

Premise 
Four film school students as part of their project goes for location hunting . There they meet a  person with a weird personality & attitude, an academic in parapsychology. The students gets into the world of Ouija board and an entity through this man.

Cast 
 Lal as Chandrakumar, a professor 
 Bharath as Aravind
 Ajmal Ameer as Arun
 Baiju as Ambareesh
 Krrish as Kevin 
 Sneha Ajith as Anjalina
 Lekha Prajapathi as Gayathri
 Anand Radhakrishnan as Domianos
 Vivek as Irfan
 Anu Sonara 
 Devan as Vincent 
 Maala Parvathi
 P. Sreekumar
 K.P.Suresh Kumar

Production
The shoot of the film took place in 2019 in places like Kuttikanam and Peermade. The film was completed and ready for release by January 2020, but the release was delayed owing to the pandemic.

Release
The film was released on 10 December 2021. A critic from Malayala Manorama gave the film a negative review. A reviewer from JSNewsTimes wrote "many attempts to intimidate lead to laughter in the theater", and gave the film a negative review. A critic from Samayam also gave the film a negative review, while a critic from Lens Men Review noted "Kshanam is a movie about a group of people who went to a hill station to make a diploma film. And the funny side is that this one looks shoddier than a diploma film."

References

External links
 

2021 horror thriller films
Indian horror thriller films
Films shot in Munnar
Films shot in Idukki
Films scored by Gopi Sundar
2021 films
2020s Malayalam-language films